Mylothris superbus is a butterfly in the family Pieridae. It is found in the Nguru Mountains of Tanzania. The habitat consists of submontane forests.

References

Butterflies described in 1985
Pierini
Endemic fauna of Tanzania
Butterflies of Africa